The  is a Japanese grouping of Buddhist deities, particularly in the Shingon sect of Buddhism. The deities are, in fact, not only Buddhas, but include bodhisattvas and Wisdom Kings. In Shingon services, lay followers recite a devotional mantra to each figure, though in Shingon practice, disciples will typically devote themselves to only one, depending on what the teacher assigns. Thus the chanting of the mantras of the Thirteen Buddhas are merely the basic practice of laypeople.

Funeral rituals 

The Thirteen Buddhas are also an important part of a traditional Japanese Buddhist funeral service, with each deity having a corresponding memorial service for the deceased. The thirteen in Japanese and Sanskrit and the corresponding date of their service after the death are:

 Fudō (Acala), 7th day
 Shaka (Sakyamuni), 14th day
 Monju (Manjushri), 21st day
 Fugen (Samantabhadra), 28th day
 Jizō (Ksitigarbha), 35th day
 Miroku (Maitreya), 42nd day
 Yakushi (Bhaisajyaguru), 49th day
 Kannon (Avalokitesvara), 100th day
 Seishi (Mahasthamaprapta), 1st anniversary
 Amida (Amitabha), 2nd anniversary
 Ashuku (Akshobhya), 6th anniversary
 Dainichi (Vairocana), 12th anniversary
 Kokūzō (Akasagarbha), 32nd anniversary

Mantras

While the thirteen figures have several mantras associated to each respectively, those listed below pertain to the standard formula used in Japanese ritual. The Shingon and Tendai schools each use a different method of transliteration of the original Sanskrit. Bhaisajyaguru is the only figure whose mantra fundamentally differs between traditions.

 Fudōmyōō (Acala):
 (Sanskrit) namaḥ samanta vajrāṇāṃ caṇḍa mahāroṣaṇa sphoṭaya hūṃ traṭ hāṃ māṃ
 (Shingon) nōmaku sanmanda bazara dan senda makaroshada sowataya untarata kanman 

 (Tendai) namaku samanda bazaranan senda makaroshana sowataya untarata kanman

 Shaka nyorai (Sakyamuni):
 (Sanskrit) namaḥ samanta buddhānāṃ bhaḥ
 (Shingon) nōmaku sanmanda bodanan baku
 (Tendai) namaku samanda bodanan ba
 Monju bosatsu (Manjushri):
 (Sanskrit) oṃ a ra pa ca na
 (Shingon) on arahashanō
 (Tendai) on a ra ha sha na
 Fugen bosatsu (Samantabhadra):
 (Sanskrit) oṃ samayas tvaṃ
 (Shingon) on sanmaya satoban
 (Tendai) on samaya sataban
 Jizō bosatsu (Ksitigarbha):
 (Sanskrit) oṃ ha ha ha vismaye svāhā
 (Shingon) on kakaka bisanmaei sowaka
 (Tendai) on kakakabi samaei sowaka
 Miroku bosatsu (Maitreya):
 (Sanskrit) oṃ maitreya svāhā
 (Shingon) on maitareiya sowaka
 (Tendai) on maitariya sowaka
 Yakushi nyorai (Bhaisajyaguru):
 (Sanskrit) oṃ huru huru caṇḍāli mātangi svāhā
 (Shingon) on korokoro sendari matōgi sowaka
 (Sanskrit) oṃ bhaiṣajye bhaiṣajye bhaiṣajya samudgate svāhā
 (Tendai) on baiseizeibaiseizei baiseijasanborgyatei sowaka (
 Kanzeon bosatsu (Avalokitesvara):
 (Sanskrit) oṃ ārolik svāhā
 (Shingon) on arorikya sowaka
 (Tendai) on arorikya sowaka
 Seishi bosatsu (Mahasthamaprapta):
 (Sanskrit) oṃ saṃ jaṃ jaṃ saḥ svāhā
 (Shingon) on san zan saku sowaka
 (Tendai) on sanzen zensaku sowaka
 Amida nyorai (Amitabha):
 (Sanskrit) oṃ amṛta teje hara hūṃ
 (Shingon) on amirita teisei kara un
 (Tendai) on amirita teisei kara un
 Ashuku nyorai (Akshobhya):
 (Sanskrit) oṃ akṣobhya hūṃ
 (Shingon) on akishubiya un
 (Tendai) on akishubiya un
 Dainichi nyorai (Vairocana):
 (Sanskrit) oṃ a vi ra hūṃ khaṃ vajradhātu vaṃ 
 (Shingon) on abiraunken basara datoban
 (Tendai) on abiraunken basara datoban
 Kokūzō bosatsu (Akashagarbha):
 (Sanskrit) namo ākāśagarbhāya oṃ ārya kāmāri mauli svāhā
 (Shingon) nōbō akyashakyarabaya on arikya mari bori sowaka
 (Tendai) namo akyashagerubaya onarikya maribori sowaka

Zodiac
Eight of the thirteen figures are traditionally assigned as guardians of the twelve Earthly Branches of the Chinese zodiac.

See also
Thirteen Buddhas of Anan
Thirteen Buddhas of Awaji Island
Thirteen Buddhas of Chichibu
Thirteen Buddhist Sites of Dewa
Thirteen Buddhas of Hokkaido
Thirteen Buddhist Sites of Iyo
Thirteen Buddhist Sites of Izumo
Thirteen Buddhist Sites of Kamakura
Thirteen Buddhist Sites of Kobe
Thirteen Buddhist Sites of Kyoto
Thirteen Buddhist Sites of Musashi
Thirteen Buddhist Sites of Osaka
Thirteen Buddhas of Tama
Thirteen Buddhist Sites of Yamagata
Thirteen Buddhist Sites of Yamato

References

Bodhisattvas
Japan religion-related lists
Japanese mythology
Buddhas
Buddhism in the Edo period
Shingon Buddhism
13 (number)